Forkhead box protein H1 is a protein that in humans is encoded by the FOXH1 gene.

Function 

FOXH1 encodes a human homolog of Xenopus forkhead activin signal transducer-1. FOXH1 protein binds SMAD2 and activates an activin response element via binding the DNA motif TGT(G/T)(T/G)ATT.

FoxH1is a transcription factor that contains a conserved function in chordates. FoxH1, acts in combination with other transcription factors, as a critical element of node formation in early embryo development. Specifically, FoxH1 plays a role in anterior/posterior determination during gastrulation. By the third week of gestation, cells of the splanchnic mesoderm have migrated to the superior end of the embryo to form the cardiac crescent. The cardiac crescent forms two heart fields; primary heart field and the secondary heart field. At this point in development, the two heart fields fuse to form a primitive, single-chambered heart referred to as the primary myocardium. The secondary (anterior) heart field of these cardiac crescent cells will give rise to the outflow tract and the right ventricle of the mature heart. A model lacking FoxH1 will form a primary myocardium, undergo some amount of looping, but have undefined right ventricles and outflow tracts.

Interactions 

FOXH1 has been shown to interact with DRAP1 and Mothers against decapentaplegic homolog 2.

See also 
 FOX proteins

References 

 ·     Slagle CE, Aoki T, Burdine RD. Nodal-dependent mesendoderm specification requires the combinatorial activities of FoxH1 and Eomesodermin. PLoS Genet. 2011;7(5):e1002072. doi:10.1371/journal.pgen.1002072
 Hoodless PA, Pye M, Chazaud C, et al. FoxH1 (Fast) functions to specify the anterior primitive streak in the mouse. Genes Dev. 2001;15(10):1257-1271. doi:10.1101/gad.881501
 ·     von Both I, Silvestri C, Erdemir T, et al. Foxh1 is essential for development of the anterior heart field. Dev Cell. 2004;7(3):331-345. doi:10.1016/j.devcel.2004.07.023

Further reading

External links 
 

Forkhead transcription factors